Neal Thompson (23 June 1905 – 13 April 1987) was an  Australian rules footballer who played with North Melbourne in the Victorian Football League (VFL).

Notes

External links 

1905 births
1987 deaths
Australian rules footballers from Victoria (Australia)
North Melbourne Football Club players